Ann Muriel, Lady Gammans (born 6 March 1898 – 28 December 1989) was a British Conservative politician. She was elected Member of Parliament for Hornsey at a 1957 by-election following the death of her husband Sir David Gammans, and served until her retirement at the 1966 general election.

References

External links 

1898 births
1989 deaths
Conservative Party (UK) MPs for English constituencies
Female members of the Parliament of the United Kingdom for English constituencies
UK MPs 1955–1959
UK MPs 1959–1964
UK MPs 1964–1966
20th-century British women politicians
Wives of baronets
20th-century English women
20th-century English people